The Canadian Booksellers Association (CBA) is an organization that promotes and advocates for Canadian booksellers, publishers and authors. Its membership is open to bookstore owners and "affiliated stakeholders" like authors and publishers. The organization was created in 1952. The association advocates on behalf of booksellers to the Canadian government, notably questioning potential changes to the national competition policies.

The association has been noted for its opposition to online retailer Amazon.com, particularly the company's plans to expand into Canada. University of Ottawa professor Michael Geist criticized this effort as "a transparent attempt to hamstring a tough competitor".

See also
List of booksellers associations

References

External links
CBA homepage

Bookselling trade associations
Trade associations based in Canada